Alexander Gadjiev (Slovene: Aleksander Gadžijev) (born 23 December 1994) is an Italian-Slovenian classical pianist.

Biography
Gadjiev studied at the Mozarteum University Salzburg under Pavel Gililov and the Hochschule für Musik Hanns Eisler Berlin under Eldar Nebolsin.  He won first prize at the Hamamatsu International Piano Competition in 2015.

In 2019, Gadjiev joined the BBC New Generation Artists scheme, for the scheduled period of 2019-2021.  In the wake of the COVID-19 pandemic, the period of the 2019-2021 roster of New Generation Artists was extended to 2022, including Gadjiev.  Gadjiev won second prize, ex aequo, as well as the Special Prize for the Best Performance of a Sonata at the XVIII International Chopin Piano Competition in 2021.  Also in 2021, he won first prize and six other prizes in the 2021 Sydney International Piano Competition.

References

External links
 
 Reinicke Artists agency page on Alexander Gadjiev

1994 births
Living people
Italian classical pianists
Slovenian classical pianists
21st-century Italian musicians
21st-century classical pianists
Prize-winners of the International Chopin Piano Competition
21st-century Slovenian people